Scott Alexander Russell (born 1958) is a Canadian sports writer and sportscaster.

Russell's broadcasting career began in 1985 as a reporter for CBC Radio Charlottetown. He has worked on various CBC Sports broadcasts including Hockey Night in Canada from 1989 until 2003, and again from 2005 until now.  

He is the network's top broadcaster for gymnastics and has covered them at the Olympic Games of 1996, 2000, 2004, 2008*, 2012, 2016, and 2020 (delayed by the Covid-19 pandemic until 2021), the 1994 Commonwealth Games and the 1999 Pan American Games.(* - He was the host for the second half of the 2008 Summer Olympics, since the previous host, Ron MacLean's mother died).  

He has also worked as a studio host on coverage for each of the Winter Olympics of 1992, 1998, 2002, 2006, 2010, 2014, 2018, and 2022. 

He has also periodically worked on Canadian Football League games and curling telecasts as a sideline reporter. 

He hosted CBC Sports Saturday from 2003 until 2005. He also hosted CBC's coverage of the 2010 FIFA World Cup and the 2011 FIFA Women's World Cup.

Russell is from Oshawa, Ontario, and earned a Master of Arts degree from the University of Western Ontario in 1985.

Bibliography
 1997: The Rink: Stories from Hockey’s Home Towns (co-author with Chris Cuthbert)
 2000: Ice Time: a Canadian Hockey Journey
 2003: Open House (Doubleday), on the subject of curling

References

External links
 Scott Russell at CBC Media Centre
 Random House: Scott Russell
 PEI Books: Scott Russell

1958 births
Living people
Canadian sportswriters
Canadian television sportscasters
National Hockey League broadcasters
People from Oshawa
Writers from Ontario
University of Western Ontario alumni
Association football commentators
Olympic Games broadcasters
Curling broadcasters
Canadian horse racing announcers